Masłowice; is a village in the administrative district of Gmina Postomino, within Sławno County, West Pomeranian Voivodeship, in north-western Poland.

The village has a population of 165. Which will soon drop to around 90 after some villagers were offered jobs in late May 2013 away from the village.

References

Villages in Sławno County